Haydil Rivera Escobales is a beauty pageant titleholder from Puerto Rico. Haydil previously held the title of Miss Puerto Rico International 2007 in which later on she placed as finalist at the Miss International 2007 pageant where she competed as Miss Adjuntas.

References

Living people
1986 births
People from Adjuntas, Puerto Rico
Puerto Rican beauty pageant winners
Miss International 2007 delegates